Sergei Volgin (born 5 May 1960) is a Kazakh football coach and a former player. He is the manager of FC Zhas Kyran.

Career

Player
He played 174 games in Soviet Top League and scored 34 goals. His position was midfielder.

Managerial
He started his coaching career in 2001 when he worked at Russian FC Uralan Elista. His first club to manage was FC Irtysh of Kazakhstan Premier League. He started season 2008 with FC Atyrau, but was sacked shortly because of poor team performance.

On 17 June 2015, Volgin was sacked as manager of FC Akzhayik.

Honours

Club
Kairat
 Kazakhstan Premier League (1): 1992

Individual
 1992 Kazakhstan FF ""Best Player of the year""

References

External links
Lyakhov.kz Atyrau squad 2008 

1960 births
Living people
Sportspeople from Almaty
Soviet footballers
Kazakhstani footballers
Soviet Top League players
Kazakhstan Premier League players
FC Sibir Novosibirsk players
FC Spartak Moscow players
Kazakhstani football managers
FC Atyrau managers
FC Irtysh Pavlodar managers
FC Kairat players
FC Tekstilshchik Kamyshin players
FC Fakel Voronezh players
Russian Premier League players
FC Elista managers
FC Kairat managers
FC Fakel Voronezh managers
Kazakhstani expatriate football managers
Kazakhstani expatriate sportspeople in Russia
Expatriate football managers in Russia
Association football midfielders